The 2014 James Madison Dukes football team represented James Madison University in the 2014 NCAA Division I FCS football season. They were led by first year head coach Everett Withers and played their home games at Bridgeforth Stadium and Zane Showker Field. They were a member of the Colonial Athletic Association. They finished the season 9–4, 6–2 in CAA play to finish in third place. They received an at-large bid to the FCS Playoffs where they lost in the first round to Liberty.

Schedule

Source: Schedule

Ranking movements

References

James Madison
James Madison Dukes football seasons
James Madison
James Madison Dukes football